Robert James Dazo Gier (born 6 January 1981) is a Filipino former footballer who played mainly as a centre back for various clubs in the United Kingdom and the Philippines national team where he was also the captain.

Early life
Rob Gier was born to Robert Gier and Rosario and grew up in Ascot, England. Upon coming from work, Rob's father would often bring him to football training. His mother, Rosario is a Waray from Tacloban, Leyte.

Club career
Gier began his career at Wimbledon, who had been relegated from the Premiership in 1999–00 season. He made his debut the following season, starting a 0–0 home draw with Sheffield United on 28 October 2000.

In 2004, he joined Rushden & Diamonds, and was part of the side that was relegated from the Football League in 2005–06. He left the club following their relegation, and had spells in the Conference with Cambridge United, and Woking during the 2006–07 season.

He joined Aldershot Town at the start of the 2007–08 season, and was part of the side that won the Conference with a record points total. He made 38 league appearances for the club, all starts, but despite this was released at the end of the campaign.

On 22 May 2008, Grays Athletic announced they had signed Gier on a one-year contract, however, he was transfer listed by the club in January 2009, with financial pressures and manager Wayne Burnett's plans being cited as the reason.

Gier joined Hellenic League Premier Division club Ascot United in November 2009, after being released at the end of the previous season by Grays Athletic. He announced his retirement in February 2016.

International career
Gier was called up to the Philippines national team in March 2009, for the 2010 AFC Challenge Cup qualifiers in April, where they were due to face, Turkmenistan, Bhutan and the Maldives. He made his international debut in 2010 AFC Challenge Cup qualification match against Bhutan on 14 April 2009 and also played against Maldives and Turkmenistan.

On 10 September 2012 Gier scored his first international goal for the Philippines in a 2–1 loss to Laos, however it was not a FIFA-sanctioned match. FIFA did not recognize the match's results after it was found out that the referees who officiated the match were not recognized by the world sporting body.

He scored his first official international goal for the Philippines in the 2014 Philippine Peace Cup against Chinese Taipei.

International goals
Scores and results list the Philippines' goal tally first.

Retirement
On 17 February 2016 Gier announced his retirement from playing competitive football at the age of 35. Gier is set to focus on operating Zenith Soccer Tours and spending more time with his family.

Earlier in 2014, Gier established Zenith Soccer Tours, a youth football program in the United Kingdom. The idea was concepted by Gier, after he met with the Philippine national youth team who had a three-week training camp in the UK in 2013.

Coaching career

Oxford University (Women's)
In November 2016, Gier was appointed as head coach of the women's football team of the Oxford University. He served in this role until May 2018.

Gier obtained a UEFA A coaching licence by September 2017. While still playing for the national team and Ascot United, he began finishing a two-year course to obtain the UEFA A coaching licence. He plans to coach in the United Kingdom while working for a UEFA Pro Licence that would make him eligible to coach in the FA Premier League and UEFA competitions. He has expressed his openness to coach for the Philippine national team.

Reading (Women's)
In 2017, Gier began working with Reading F.C. Women as its women's development coach.  He was eventually promoted as the Reading F.C. Women academy manager in July 2018.

Honours

Club
Aldershot Town
Conference National: 2007–08
Conference League Cup: 2007–08

International
Philippines
AFC Challenge Cup: Third 2012
Philippine Peace Cup: 2013

Personal life
Gier is married and has two children. His family resides in England.

References

External links

1981 births
Living people
English people of Filipino descent
Filipino people of English descent
People from Ascot, Berkshire
Citizens of the Philippines through descent
Filipino British sportspeople
British Asian footballers
English footballers
Filipino footballers
Filipino expatriate footballers
Philippines international footballers
Association football defenders
National League (English football) players
English Football League players
Aldershot Town F.C. players
Cambridge United F.C. players
Grays Athletic F.C. players
Rushden & Diamonds F.C. players
Wimbledon F.C. players
Woking F.C. players
Ascot United F.C. players
Filipino football head coaches